is a Japanese rally driver.

Career
Taguchi began rallying in 1994. He based most of his rallying in Australia and New Zealand, competing in his first World Rally Championship event on Rally New Zealand in 1995. In 1999 he won the Asia-Pacific Rally Championship (APRC). In 2001 he competed on the Cyprus Rally as part of the factory Mitsubishi Ralliart team. He finished eighth overall on the 2007 Rally Japan, winning the Group N category and scoring one WRC point. In 2010, he won the APRC title again.

References

External links
Official website
Profile at eWRC-results.com

Living people
1972 births
People from Okayama Prefecture
Japanese rally drivers
World Rally Championship drivers
Intercontinental Rally Challenge drivers